Batbayan ruled the Khazarian Bulgars mentioned by Theophanes and Nicephorus after the Khazars defeated the Bulgars and Old Great Bulgaria disintegrated.

There is a scholarly theory that he may have been the same person as Bezmer of the Nominalia of the Bulgarian khans who may have been also the first son of Kubrat. He was a member of the Dulo clan, who after Kubrat's death ruled Old Great Bulgaria, but his rule lasted only three years. Kevin Alan Brook calls him Bayan. Batbayan would have then ruled the Bulgars as a subject to the Khazar Khagan.

Sources 

Year of birth unknown
European royalty
Bulgars